On the night of 15 October 1919, Clement De La Haye, the principal of Newington House, a college in Madras (now known as Chennai), India was murdered. It led to a highly sensationalized trial known as the De La Haye murder case or Madras murder case. No one was convicted and the case remains unsolved to this day.

Events 
On the night of 15 October 1919, De La Haye, the principal of Newington House was shot dead in his bed. The Newington House was a school of the Court of Wards which attended to the educational requirements of minor princes of the various princely states of British India. By an order of the Government of India under section 27 of the Criminal Procedure Code, the case was transferred from the Madras High Court to the Bombay High Court. Various motives were assigned to the murder. However, in the end, the main accused was acquitted. The case remains unsolved to this day.

Suspects 
Various motives have been assigned to the murder. According to eyewitnesses, the boys at the house were frequently offended by De La Haye's racist remarks as he often addressed them as "barbarous Tamilians". There were also rumours that some of the boys in the college were seduced by De La Haye's wife.

As the trial progressed, one of the conspirators, the heir to Singampatti estate turned approved. He gave a detailed description of the events of the night.

Aftermath
Based on Singampatti's testimony, the heir to Kadambur estate was implicated in the murder. However, on detailed scrutiny, the jury found Singampatti's version of the events to be false. Kadambur was eventually acquitted.

The Newington House was closed shortly after the murder.

See also
List of unsolved murders

Notes

References 
 

1919 murders in India
1919 in British India
1919 in India
Male murder victims
Unsolved murders in India